Vincent Da Silva is a retired American soccer goalkeeper who played professionally in the United States and Portugal.

Da Silva was a member of the Santa Clara Sporting Club in his youth.  In 1988, he played for the San Jose Earthquakes in the Western Soccer Alliance.  That season, the F.C. Seattle Storm crushed the Earthquakes, 5-0, in the championship game.  Da Silva came  on in the 73rd minute for starter Aram Kardzair and kept a clean sheet for the rest of the game.  In 1989, he played for Real Santa Barbara.  In 1992, Da Silva had the lowest goals against average in the USISL while playing for the Palo Alto Firebirds.  Da Silva was All League and the Firebirds won the league title.  In 1993, Da Silva was All League for the second year in a row with the Firebirds.  That fall, he moved to Porgugal to sign with F.C. Alverca in the Segunda Divisão de Honra.

External links

References

Living people
1967 births
American soccer players
American expatriate soccer players
F.C. Alverca players
Palo Alto Firebirds players
Real Santa Barbara players
San Jose Earthquakes (1974–1988) players
USISL players
Western Soccer Alliance players
Association football goalkeepers